Occella kuronumai is a fish in the family Agonidae. It was described by Harry Wyman Freeman in 1951, originally in the genus Occa. It is a marine, temperate water-dwelling fish which is known from the coast of northern Honshu, Japan, in the Sea of Japan in the northwestern Pacific Ocean.

References

kuronmai
Fish described in 1951